The 1994 EA Generali Open, also known as the Austrian Open, was a men's tennis tournament held on outdoor clay courts at the Kitzbüheler Tennisclub in Kitzbühel, Austria that was part of the ATP World Series of the 1994 ATP Tour. It was the 24th edition of the tournament and was held from 1 August until 8 August 1994. First-seeded Goran Ivanišević won the singles title.

Finals

Singles

 Goran Ivanišević defeated  Fabrice Santoro 6–2, 4–6, 4–6, 6–3, 6–2
 It was Ivanišević 1st singles title of the year and 10th of his career.

Doubles

 David Adams /  Andrei Olhovskiy defeated  Sergio Casal /  Emilio Sánchez 6–7, 6–3, 7–5

References

External links
 ITF tournament details

Austrian Open(tennis)
Austrian Open Kitzbühel
Austrian Open